Caspio is an American software company headquartered in Sunnyvale, California, with offices in Ukraine, Poland and the Philippines. Caspio was founded by Frank Zamani in 2000. The company focuses on  database-centric web applications.

History
Caspio was founded by Frank Zamani in 2000. The company initially focused on simplifying custom cloud applications and reducing development time and cost as compared to traditional software development.

Caspio released the first version of its platform, Caspio Bridge, in 2001. In 2014, Caspio released a HIPAA-Compliant Edition of its low-code application development platform.

Caspio also released an EU General Data Protection Regulation (GDPR) Compliance Edition of its low-code application development platform in 2016. Caspio's second European Software Development Center opened in Kraków, Poland in 2017. Caspio also opened data centers in Montreal, Canada and India in 2020.

References

Online databases
Web applications
Cloud applications
Cloud platforms
Web development
Software development
Software development process
Cloud computing
Cloud computing providers
Information technology management
Types of databases
As a service
Software companies based in the San Francisco Bay Area
Software companies of the United States
2000 establishments in the United States
2000 establishments in California
Software companies established in 2000
Companies established in 2000